Trichocerosia variabilis is a species of moth in the subfamily Arctiinae. It was first described by Rothschild in 1901 and is found in Papua New Guinea.

References

Nudariina
Moths described in 1901
Moths of New Guinea